Fagesia superstes is a small, subglobular ammonite (suborder Ammonitina) belonging to the vascoceratid family. This species lived during the Turonian stage of the late Cretaceous, 92-88 Ma ago.

References
Paleobiology Database
Global Names

Acanthoceratoidea